Antonina Aleksandrovna Kymytval (April 22, 1938 – October 29, 2015) was a Chukchi poet and children's writer who wrote mainly in her native language.

Biography
Born in the village of Mukhomornoye, Anadyrsky District, Kymytval was the daughter of a reindeer herder, and was called "Rul-tyne" at birth. Her parents died when she was young, as did her twin brother, whereupon she was renamed "Kymytval", Chukchi for "worm", in an attempt to ward off evil. She first attended boarding school before entering the Anadyr Pedagogical College in 1958, from which she graduated the following year; it was at this time she began to write poetry, publishing her first volume, in Chukchi, in Magadan in 1960. In this same year she entered the Higher Party School of Khabarovsk, and soon thereafter she became deputy editor of the Sovetskaya Chukotka newspaper. She went to Moscow for further study in 1966 and 1967, and in 1968 published her first volume of verse for children. She continued to write plays and poems for children, developing a relationship with the Magadan Puppet Theater. Kymytval lived in Magadan for many years before her death. Late in life she was incapacitated by a series of strokes; she died in Abinsk, in the home of her daughter.

Kymytval wrote lyric poetry, and concerned herself with descriptions of the landscape in which she lived. Some of her work has been translated into Russian. A member of the Writers' Union since 1962, she received the Order of the Badge of Honor and the Medal "For Labour Valour" in 1988. In 1990 she received an award for her work from the UNESCO International Children's Book Council.

References

1938 births
2015 deaths
20th-century Russian women writers
20th-century Russian poets
20th-century Russian dramatists and playwrights
21st-century Russian women writers
21st-century Russian poets
21st-century Russian dramatists and playwrights
Chukchi people
Chukchi-language writers
Soviet women writers
Russian women poets
Women dramatists and playwrights
People from Chukotka Autonomous Okrug